Sir Philip Carteret, 1st Baronet (1620 – between 1663 and 1675), also known as Philippe de Carteret III, was the 4th Seigneur of Sark. He supported the Royalist (Cavalier) cause during the War of the Three Kingdoms.

Biography
Philip Carteret was the son of Philippe de Carteret II. He succeeded to the Seigneurie of Sark on the death of his father in 1643.

During the English Civil War Carteret was lieutenant to his kinsman George Carteret, and was knighted on the beach of St Aubin's Bay in Jersey by the exiled Charles, Prince of Wales in 1645.

In 1661 he became Bailiff of Jersey. in 1670 he was created a baronet, of St Owen on the Island of Jersey.

Family
Carteret married Anne (1566–1644), daughter of Abraham Dumaresq Seig Des Augres. They had children including Phillip (1650-1693) and two daughters.

References

Sources
 
  

1620 births
1660s deaths
Philippe de Carteret III
People from Sark
Bailiffs of Jersey
Baronets in the Baronetage of England